John Leoline Phillips (2 August 1879 – 31 March 1947) was the Dean of Monmouth from 1931 until 1946.

Phillips was born in Radyr. He was educated at Christ College, Brecon, and Keble College, Oxford; and ordained in 1909. He was a schoolmaster at St Paul's West Kensington from 1905 until 1921 (also serving in the RAOC during World War I) when he became Headmaster of his old school, a post he held until his appointment as Dean. He died in Newport.

References

1879 births
Clergy from Cardiff
People educated at Christ College, Brecon
Alumni of Keble College, Oxford
Royal Army Ordnance Corps officers
Welsh Anglicans
Deans of Monmouth
1947 deaths
British Army personnel of World War I